Pakadiguddam Dam, is an earthfill dam on Devghat river near Korpana in the state of Maharashtra in India.

Specifications

Purpose
 Irrigation
पकडीगुड्म हा मध्यम सिंचन प्रकल्प आहे. सदर प्रकल्प कोरपना तालुक्यात आहे.

See also
 Dams in Maharashtra
 List of reservoirs and dams in India

References

Dams in Chandrapur district
Dams completed in 1993
1993 establishments in Maharashtra